Parotocinclus is a genus of fish in the family Loricariidae native to South America.  This genus is distributed through almost all hydrographic systems in South America from the Guyana Shield drainages and Amazon Shield tributaries to the coastal drainages of eastern and southeastern Brazil, including the rio São Francisco basin. Most species have the caudal peduncle oval in cross section. It has been found that Characidium species may interact with P. maculicauda. The small Characidium will follow grazing P. maculicauda, which release particulate matter dislodged from the catfish's foraging.

Taxonomy
By an analysis published in 2005, Parotocinclus is not a monophyletic genus. P. jumbo is not closely related to P. maculicauda, but is positioned, instead, as a basal lineage of the subfamily Hypoptopomatinae. Additionally, P. collinsae is not closely related to Parotocinclus maculicauda and may be more closely related to the genus Hypoptopoma and four other genera. P. jumbo and P. collinsae may eventually be transferred to new genera. P. bidentatus and P. muriaensis form a monophyletic pair of sister taxa that is more closely related to a subset of species of Parotocinclus (which includes P. maculicauda) than to any other genus of the tribe Otothyrini.

Species
There are currently 38 recognized species in this genus: 
 Parotocinclus adamanteus  
Parotocinclus amazonensis Garavello, 1977
 Parotocinclus arandai Sarmento-Soares, Lehmann A. & Martins-Pinheiro, 2009
 Parotocinclus aripuanensis Garavello, 1988
 Parotocinclus bahiensis (A. Miranda-Ribeiro, 1918)
 Parotocinclus bidentatus Gauger & Buckup, 2005
 Parotocinclus britskii Boeseman, 1974
 Parotocinclus cabessadecuia  
 Parotocinclus cearensis Garavello, 1977
 Parotocinclus cesarpintoi P. Miranda-Ribeiro, 1939
 Parotocinclus collinsae Schmidt & Ferraris, 1985
 Parotocinclus cristatus Garavello, 1977
 Parotocinclus dani Roxo, G. S. C. Silva & C. de Oliveira, 2016 
 Parotocinclus doceanus (A. Miranda-Ribeiro, 1918)
 Parotocinclus eppleyi Schaefer & Provenzano, 1993
 Parotocinclus halbothi Lehmann A., Lazzarotto & R. E. dos Reis, 2014 
 Parotocinclus hardmani Lehmann A., Lujan & R. E. dos Reis, 2022
 Parotocinclus haroldoi Garavello, 1988
 Parotocinclus jacksoni Ramos, Lustosa-Costa, Barros-Neto & Barbosa, 2021
 Parotocinclus jacumirim D. E. da Silva Jr., T. P. A. Ramos & A. M. Zanata, 2020
 Parotocinclus jequi Lehmann A., Koech Braun, E. H. L. Pereira & R. E. dos Reis, 2013 
 Parotocinclus jimi Garavello, 1977
 Parotocinclus jumbo Britski & Garavello, 2002
 Parotocinclus longirostris Garavello, 1988
 Parotocinclus maculicauda (Steindachner, 1877)
 Parotocinclus minutus Garavello, 1977
 Parotocinclus muriaensis Gauger & Buckup, 2005
Parotocinclus nandae 
 Parotocinclus planicauda Garavello & Britski, 2003
 Parotocinclus polyochrus Schaefer, 1988
 Parotocinclus prata A. C. Ribeiro, A. L. A. Melo & E. H. L. Pereira, 2002
 Parotocinclus robustus Lehmann A. & R. E. dos Reis, 2012 
 Parotocinclus seridoensis T. P. A. Ramos, Barros-Neto, Britski & S. M. Q. Lima, 2013 
 Parotocinclus spilosoma (Fowler, 1941)
 Parotocinclus spilurus (Fowler, 1941) 
 Parotocinclus variola Lehmann A., Schvambach & R. E. dos Reis, 2015 
 Parotocinclus yaka Lehmann, Lima & Reis, 2018

References

Fish of South America
Freshwater fish genera
Otothyrinae
Taxa named by Carl H. Eigenmann
Taxa named by Rosa Smith Eigenmann
Catfish genera